Mexcala elegans is a species of spiders in the jumping spider family, Salticidae. It is found in Southern Africa. It preys on ants.

References 

 Mexcala elegans at jumping-spiders.com.

Salticidae
Spiders of Africa
Arthropods of Southern Africa
Spiders described in 1903